The Daring Swimmer is a 1957 West German comedy film directed by Karl Anton and starring Gunther Philipp, Susanne Cramer and Walter Gross. It was shot at the Bavaria Studios in Munich. The film's sets were designed by the art directors Wolf Englert and Ernst Richter.

Cast
Gunther Philipp as Otto von Senff - Damenwäschefabrikant
Susanne Cramer as Gaby Marshall
Walter Gross as Dr. Hans Sommer 
Ruth Stephan as Karin Biedermann
Gunnar Möller as Dr. Richard Moebius
Ursula Herwig as Ulla von Senff - Otto's sister
Boy Gobert as Fritz Hohebirke
Hanita Hallan as Lili Jonas
Franz Muxeneder as Xaver Kraxentrager
Hilde Berndt as Emma
Franz Fröhlich as mayor
Lolita as herself, singer
Harry Halm
Elsie Attenhofer as Tante Katie
Samira Soliaman as singer
Jörg Maria Berg as himself, singer
Georg Blädel as himself, singer
Stan Oliver as himself, singer

See also
The Daring Swimmer (1934)

References

External links

1957 comedy films
German comedy films
West German films
Films directed by Karl Anton
German films based on plays
Remakes of German films
Films shot at Bavaria Studios
Constantin Film films
1950s German films
1950s German-language films